City & Metropolitan Building Society was a UK building society, founded by Frederick Cleary CBE in 1948 which merged with the Stroud & Swindon Building Society in 1996.

References

External links
Stroud & Swindon Building Society website

Banks established in 1948